T'Melle is an American R&B and Hip-hop, singer, dancer, and songwriter.

Early career

T'Melle was discovered by the late Lisa "Left Eye" Lopes of TLC. Lopes added her to one of her girl groups, Egypt. The other group members were Joy "Zada" Lonon, Katrina "Akila" Gibson, and Sophia "Isis" Gibson. T'Melle was previously named T'Nef. Lopes mentored and managed the group. On April 25, 2002, a car crash in La Ceiba, Honduras killed Lopes and injured other friends and family members, including T'Melle. T'Melle was among the seriously injured passengers, and unable to walk on her own. T'Melle left the group, began using a wheelchair, and underwent numerous surgeries to her left leg and hip.

Solo career
Although she was a teenager, she convinced her parents to support her move to Atlanta, Georgia, so she could continue her career path. Through diligent hard work and focus, T'Melle was introduced to Walter Sutton, CEO of Infra-Red Entertainment, an Atlanta-based entertainment company. While in Atlanta, T'Melle perfected every aspect of her craft and captured the attention of R&B notable Usher Raymond. Soon after, she traveled with Usher on a European tour as his only female background singer. Grammy Award-winning producer, Tricky Stewart, who was also captivated by her vocals and stage performance style, took her under his wing, which aided in her advancement as an artist.

T'Melle's most recent album, "The Interview", was released in 2013. It was led by the single Go To War, which was released in April 2011. "Pill" was released on Rapper Future's Mixtape "Welcome 2 Mollyworld" in late August.

In October 2015 she released her uptempo Single "Drop it down"!

Always leaving it all on the stage, she has also performed @ the legendary SOB's in NYC leaving industry leaders and fans amazed! In summer 2016 she released her hit Cross the line ft. Kevin Gates". The song reached a million plays on SoundCloud proving yet again that she is the stuff that stars are made of!

Completely focused and determined to show the world that with hard work, and dedication that she offered something special to share, she released a remake to Minnie Riperton's "Loving You" in early 2019 paying homage to one of the greatest soul singers of that time. T'Melle's highly anticipated EP "Dedicated" is one that is sure to inspire music lovers of all ages for years and generations to come!

References

External links
 This Is RnB
 Courtneyluv
 Official Facebook
 Rolling Out
 Official Twitter
 

American soul musicians
American contemporary R&B singers
Musicians from Philadelphia
Musicians from Atlanta
Living people
1988 births
Singers from Pennsylvania
21st-century African-American women singers